The DAF 600 is a small family car produced by DAF from 1959 until 1963. It was DAF's first production passenger car. The 600 was first presented at the Amsterdam Motor Show in February 1958 and was in production by 1959, although the firm had published the first details of the car at the end of 1957.

Manufacture  

In 1959 the first two DAF 600 cars manufactured were awarded to the first Dutch woman to be a mayor, Truus Smulders-Beliën, and the chair of the Dutch automobile club. Smulders-Beliën been chosen because she was well known and she appeared to have ordered one. She was contacted and she agreed after it was realised that it was her staff who had ordered it. She was unaware of the order and the mayor did not have a driving licence.

From 1959 till 1963, a total of 30591 cars were produced.

Variomatic transmission
The 600 was the first production car, after the 1920s Clyno, to have a continuously variable transmission (CVT) system - the innovative DAF Variomatic. The DAF Variomatic employs engine speed, via centrifugal weights, to shift the transmission and is enhanced by an engine manifold vacuum. It was the only car ever produced which went faster by the simple expedient of gently and gradually releasing the accelerator once top speed had been reached.

The Variomatic also permitted increased engine braking by operating a switch on the dashboard which reversed the action of the vacuum on the pulley's diaphragm, seeking a lower ratio with increased manifold vacuum.

Notes

https://ru.wikipedia.org/wiki/DAF_600

External links
 

600
Rear-wheel-drive vehicles
Vehicles with CVT transmission
Sedans

1960s cars
Cars introduced in 1958